Los Celos de Cándida is a 1940 Argentine comedy film.

Cast

Nini Marshall
Augusto Codecá
Hector Quintanilla
Aída Luz
Morena Chiolo
Adrían Cuneo
Elsa Marval
Armando Durán
Vicky Astory
Lea Briand
Berta Aliana
Jorge Luz

References

External links
 

1940 films
1940s Spanish-language films
Argentine black-and-white films
1940 comedy films
Argentine comedy films
1940s Argentine films